Coral cardinalfish is a common name for several fishes and may refer to:

Ostorhinchus properuptus
Sphaeramia nematoptera